"Solar Power" is a song by New Zealand singer-songwriter Lorde for her third studio album of the same name. The song was written and produced by Lorde and Jack Antonoff and was released on 11 June 2021 by Universal Music New Zealand as the album's lead single, after being announced on Lorde's website alongside the message "Patience is a virtue". The song also briefly leaked hours before its release and was pushed forward from its initial release date, 20 June. Musically, "Solar Power" is an indie folk, pop, psychedelic, and sunshine pop song.

The song received positive reviews from critics, who praised the summer-like sound of the song as well as its departure from Lorde's previous works. The song peaked inside the top-20 on charts in Australia, Bolivia, Ireland, Japan, the United Kingdom and New Zealand, and it received gold certification from the Recorded Music NZ (RMNZ).

Lorde and Joel Kefali directed the music video for "Solar Power", which has drawn comparisons to the 2019 folk horror film Midsommar. The song was translated into the Māori language by Hēmi Kelly, and was performed and released by Lorde as "Te Ao Mārama / Solar Power", the second track from her EP Te Ao Mārama, released on 9 September 2021.

Writing and production
Lorde wrote the song while visiting her friend Cazzie David on Martha's Vineyard off the coast of Massachusetts. She wrote the song on a Yamaha DX keyboard and later brought the demo to producer Jack Antonoff for further work. 

Lorde initially thought the song sounded similar to Robbie Williams' 2000 single "Rock DJ" (both songs include references to A Tribe Called Quest's "Can I Kick It?"), but she was later informed of its similarities to "Loaded", a 1990 single by the Scottish band Primal Scream. Although the similarity to "Loaded" was unintentional, and Lorde said she had never heard of Primal Scream beforehand, she contacted the band's lead singer Bobby Gillespie to clear "Solar Power" with him. In an interview Apple Music 1 DJ Zane Lowe, Lorde said Gillespie had given "Solar Power" his approval: "He was so lovely about it — he was like, 'These things happen, you caught a vibe that we caught years ago.' And he gave us his blessing. So let the record state: 'Loaded' is 100% the original blueprint for this, but we arrived at it organically. And I’m glad we did."

Aside from "Loaded", "Solar Power" has also been compared to George Michael's 1990 song "Freedom! '90". Michael's estate issued a positive statement on the similarities between the songs after the release of "Solar Power", stating "We are aware that many people are making a connection between 'Freedom '90' by George Michael and 'Solar Power' by Lorde, which George would have been flattered to hear, so on behalf of one great artist to a fellow artist, we wish her every success with the single."

The song features backing vocals from indie rock musicians Phoebe Bridgers and Clairo.

Composition and recording 

"Solar Power" has been described as a guitar-led indie folk, pop, psychedelic, and sunshine pop song. Lorde wrote and produced "Solar Power" with Jack Antonoff, with whom he had previously worked on Melodrama (2017). For their part, Malay provided additional production; Chris Gehringer handled the mastering and Will Quinnell acted as assistant. Mark "Spike" Stent did the mix with the help of Matt Wolach; Matt Chamberlain worked on the programming and played the drums. Antonoff also performed on various instruments: acoustic guitar, electric bass, twelve-string guitar, percussion, and drums; while Cole Kamen-Green participated in the trumpet, Evan Smith with the saxophone, and the artists Phoebe Bridgers and Clairo in the choirs. Lorde began writing the song in July 2019 while in Dukes County, Massachusetts; subsequently, he moved to New York City where he shared the first advances with Antonoff and expressed his desire to incorporate characteristic sounds of the music of the 2000s. The songwriting process took around six to eight months and ended once the chorus was devised.

Artwork
The cover image was photographed by Lorde's friend Ophelia, showing Lorde's buttocks. The cover art was released on Lorde's official website and the official Instagram account of her frequent collaborator Jack Antonoff on 7 June 2021, and was widely shared on social media. However, due to a large scale DMCA takedown, many Twitter accounts sharing the cover were locked for several hours. The photo quickly went viral online. Lorde responded that, "It's a specific experience thinking about everyone in your life seeing your butt. I have no regrets. I love this cover and am happy for this to be how people see my butt." There is another version of the cover art, which obscures Lorde's butt with sunlight. This obscured version was shown to Spotify users in Japan, users of China's top music streaming platforms like NetEase Cloud Music and QQ Music, Apple Music users in mainland China, Hong Kong, Japan, Saudi Arabia, and the United Arab Emirates.

Critical reception
Writing for Pitchfork, Anna Gaca called the song a "soft-touch anthem for the [summer] season's simple pleasures", and remarked that it "flipped the script" when compared to the sound of Lorde's 2017 album Melodrama. Rhian Daly of NME gave the song five out of five stars, labelling it a "sun-kissed ode to starting anew", and drew musical comparisons to the Primal Scream album Screamadelica, Joni Mitchell, and Wolf Alice's sound since Visions of a Life. Writers for New Zealand magazine The Spinoff generally praised "Solar Power", with Toby Manhire calling the song an "instant classic", and Stewart Sowman-Lund calling the song "so perfectly summery that it makes me want to drive straight to Devonport (or wherever people swim in Auckland)".

Sal Cinquemani of Slant Magazine stated that the track "boasts a breezy, psychedelic quality that's perfectly paired for summer drives and beach trips, and an optimistic outlook", while lacking "the urgency of her best songs". Writers for Vulture received the song well, with Justin Curto describing it as "a sunny, acoustic-driven song about a good day on the beach, as the cover art teases" and noted that its bridge is reminiscent of George Michael's "Freedom! '90", and Craig Jenkins called it "slight and fun", though it felt "more like a carefree vacation update than the blockbuster comeback we've been anticipating since the simpler times", while noting similarities to "the psychedelic dance-rock of early '90s UK rave kings like Happy Mondays and Primal Scream". 

In a Billboard piece, Jason Lipshutz wrote that "Lorde's new single 'Solar Power' is a playful splash of salt water onto our faces in time for the summer", calling it "deceptively simple", noting the saxophone and trumpet in the mix, and asserted that "Lorde remains one of the best at filling the corners of her songs with personalized knickknacks". In a five star review, Rachel Brodsky of The Independent praised Lorde for "finding a new way to express a universal feeling", comparing it to the Beach Boys' song "Kokomo". Consequence named it "Song of the Week", describing it as "light, bouncy, and nonchalant", emphasising its departure from Lorde's previous works.

Music video

The music video for "Solar Power" was released on 11 June 2021, directed by Lorde and Joel Kefali, which "posits Lorde almost as the leader of a happy-go-lucky, hippie solstice cult — almost a benign, yassified version of Midsommar". Stewart Sowman-Lund of The Spinoff also noted a similar connection, writing that "the music video is like if Midsommar was shot in New Zealand". Lorde told Triple J that "we built literally basically a universe on a secret beach. The first video is me introducing you to the world of the album and the videos, I play a kooky tour guide almost". In one scene Lorde takes a hit from a bong made out of a plant root to show her support of canabis use. The music video was met with a mixed reception from critics.

Filming location
With a presumption that the video was filmed in New Zealand, Newshub claimed that the location of the music video was Cactus Bay on Waiheke Island, guessing that the landmass in the distance was the Coromandel Peninsula, and presuming that a cargo ship in the background placed the video's location north of Auckland. The chair of the Waiheke Local Board, Cath Handley, also claimed that the location of the music video was Cactus Bay, which she called a "beautiful beach", but that she hoped that the music video "doesn’t hurdle huge numbers of people towards Waiheke". While not disclosing the location of the beach, in an interview with Jesse Mulligan of The Project, Lorde asked people not to "go and desecrate any beaches with selfie sticks or anything" when asked about where the video was filmed.

Credits and personnel
 Lorde – vocals, songwriting, production
 Jack Antonoff – songwriting, production, bass, electric guitar, acoustic guitar, drums, percussion, 12-string acoustic guitar
 Phoebe Bridgers – background vocals
 Clairo – background vocals
 Matt Chamberlain – drums, programming, percussion
 Evan Smith – saxophone
 Cole Kamen-Green – trumpet
 Spike Stent – mixing
 Matt Wolach – assistant mixing
 Chris Gehringer – mastering
 Will Quinnell – mastering

Charts

Weekly charts

Year-end charts

Certifications

Release history

Te Ao Mārama / Solar Power

"Te Ao Mārama / Solar Power" is a song recorded by New Zealand singer-songwriter Lorde. It is the second track from her Te Ao Mārama EP, and is performed fully in the Māori language. "Te Ao Mārama" translates to "world of light" in Māori, which is both a reference to the title of Solar Power, and the phrase "mai te pō ki te ao mārama", which Leonie Hayden of The Spinoff called "the transition from night to the enlightened world that comprises part of the Māori creation narrative (similar to Adam and Eve's apple, but from the point of view that knowledge is a good thing)". 

The song was translated into Māori by Hēmi Kelly, who said of the song, "I love the warmth of summer so it was easy for me to connect with the lyrics. It talks about leaving your worries behind and moving into a positive space. That reminded me of the transition in our creation narratives of moving from darkness, te pō, into the world of light, te ao mārama. That’s a transition we continually navigate throughout our lives."

Charts

Year-end charts

References

2021 singles
2021 songs
Lorde songs
New Zealand folk songs
Song recordings produced by Jack Antonoff
Song recordings produced by Lorde
Songs written by Jack Antonoff
Songs written by Lorde